The Lal Mandi Footbridge is a suspension-type pedestrian bridge located in the city of Srinagar in the Indian union territory of Jammu and Kashmir. It connects Wazir Bagh areas of the city to the city centre Lal Chowk.

History
It is the first suspension-type bridge to come across the Jhelum in the city. It was constructed over a period of two years under the PDP-Congress coalition government in the State led by Mufti Muhammad Sayeed and has helped greatly in easing the traffic congestion in the city centre.

Location
The bridge is vital walkway located in Srinagar, in the neighborhood of Tyndale Biscoe School.

Usage
The bridge busiest walkway which connects residential area of Wazir Bagh to Lal Chowk. It is mostly used by Tyndale Biscoe School students.

See also 
Zero Bridge
Abdullah Bridge
Amira Kadal
JK Krishi Vikas Cooperative Ltd.

References

Gallery

Bridges in Srinagar 
Buildings and structures in Srinagar
Bridges over the Jhelum River
Bridges in Jammu and Kashmir
Pedestrian bridges in India
Suspension bridges in India
Bridges completed in 2005
Transport in Srinagar